The Manny is a 2015 German comedy film directed and co-written by Matthias Schweighöfer, starring himself as a greedy and super-busy real-estate developer, and Milan Peschel as a victim of his development who accidentally ends up babysitting his two children.

Plot
Single father Clemens (Matthias Schweighöfer) is shunned by all nanny services because his two children Winnie and Theo (Paula Hartmann and Arved Friese) are impossible to babysit: they prank, bully and terrify any lady who dares to enter their mansion. But finding a nanny is hardly Clemens' number one priority, being preoccupied by his urban development which requires the demolition of an apartment building, something bitterly opposed by its residents. One of the victims, Rolf (Milan Peschel), pays Clemens a visit to voice his protest, but is mistaken as the new nanny — or manny in his case. Rolf believes it a good opportunity to sabotage Clemens' development plans, and accepts the offer. Predictably he suffers at the hands of the unruly children, but over time wins their hearts with his goofiness and sincerity. He discovers that the root of the kids' problems is that Clemens is never home. To help bring the family together, Rolf tries to show Clemens — including taking Clemens to visit his small community — that there are things more important than money in the world.

References

External links

The Manny - Pantaleon Entertainment

2015 comedy films
German comedy films
Films directed by Matthias Schweighöfer
Films set in Berlin
Films shot in Berlin
2010s German films